State v. Anderson, 2 Tenn. 6 (1804), was a case decided by the Tennessee Supreme Court that held that the intent to kill necessary to distinguish murder from manslaughter need only to be formed a moment before the act.

Subsequent history
Anderson was decided before murder was separated by statute into first and second degrees, but the timing analysis was affirmed in the 1859 opinion Lewis v. State.

References

United States murder case law
1804 in United States case law
Tennessee state case law
Murder in Tennessee
Law articles needing an infobox